The Partnership for Acid Drainage Remediation (PADRE) is a European-based scientific-technical association dedicated to acid mine water related topics.

History 

PADRE was founded in 2003 in Johannesburg, South Africa, due to the steadily increasing problems related to water in Europe. It is a sister organisation of the International Mine Water Association - IMWA and was publicly launched during IMWA’s Mine Water 2004 conference, in Newcastle upon Tyne (UK) in September 2004.

References

External links 
 PADRE - Partnership for Acid Drainage Remediation in Europe

Mining and the environment